This is a list of appointments to the New South Wales Legislative Council, caused by the resignation or death of an incumbent member. A departure creates a casual vacancy which is filled by a candidate of the same affiliation in a joint sitting of the Parliament of New South Wales. The Constitution of New South Wales states that if the previous sitting Legislative Council member was at the time of his/her election the representative of a particular political party, the nominated candidate for the vacancy must be a member of that same party.

The current system has existed since amendments in 1991. From 1934 until the 1978 electoral reforms, which introduced direct election of members of the Legislative Council, casual vacancies were filled by a vote of a joint sitting, not necessarily with a member of the same party. From 1978 until the 1991 amendments, casual vacancies were filled by the highest-polling unelected member of the party's ticket from the previous election who nominated for the vacancy, who would then be declared elected by the Governor, with a provision for joint sittings only where no one could be chosen by the former method.

List of appointments to the Legislative Council

See also
List of New South Wales state by-elections

Notes
  Gallacher was elected as a Liberal Party member in the 2011 state election. He resigned from the Liberals in 2014 and sat as an Independent until his resignation.

References

Legislative Council appointments
New South Wales Legislative Council